Lohna is a village situated Palampur in Kangra District of Himachal Pradesh, India. 
The co-ordinates are 32°7'10"N   76°32'34"E.
This is a village surrounded by the Himalayan Range and has a dense pine tree forest around it.

There is an Electricity board guest house, Government primary school, Huge overhead water tank in this village. Most of the houses used to be of mud bricks and roofing with slates. However it has changed now and people are migrating to new technologies like RCC construction. There is a Panchayat as governing body and one Zila parishad member also. Most of the people in this village are retired army personnel and their children are serving in Indian Army now.

Agriculture plays an important role in their lives as of today and they cultivate wheat, rice, maize as major crops. There is a very small portion of tea garden in the village however it's not being managed by anyone. The main religion of the population is Hinduism. And they worship Goddess Durga. There are traditional festivals held in the village like Sair, Sankrant, Holi, Lohri, Diwali, Bhai Dooj etc.

References
 

Villages in Kangra district